Abdul Latif Khan was a Bangladeshi politician affiliated with the Bangladesh Awami League who served the undivided Khulna-4 (present Bagerhat-4) constituency as a member of the Jatiya Sangsad from 1979 to 1982.

Birth and early life 
Abdul Latif Khan was born in 1933 in Alkulia village of Morrelganj Upazila of Bagerhat district of Khulna Division.

Career 
Abdul Latif Khan was elected to parliament from Khulna-4 as a Bangladesh Awami League candidate in 1979. He has served as the baksal district governor of Khulna.

Death 
Abdul Latif Khan died in Bagerhat District, Bangladesh.

References

External links 
 List of 2nd Parliament Members -Jatiya Sangsad (In Bangla)

1933 births
People from Bagerhat District
Awami League politicians
2nd Jatiya Sangsad members
Year of death missing